Yen Chow Street is a main street in Sham Shui Po, Kowloon, Hong Kong. It runs from hill side toward the shore of Victoria Harbour, between Castle Peak Road and Sham Mong Road. Its extension Yen Chow Street West spans further to the reclamation shore.

Name
The street was named after Yen Chow, a coastal city in western Guangdong in China at that time. The city is currently under the administration of Guangxi.

Yen Chow Street
Yen Chow Street crosses many main streets such as Castle Peak Road, Cheung Sha Wan Road and Lai Chi Kok Road. Featured landmarks and attractions in the area could be found on both side of the street. Golden Computer Centre, Sham Shui Po Police Station, Dragon Centre, the Yen Chow Street Hawker Bazaar, and Apliu Street are some of examples.

Yen Chow Street West
Yen Chow Street West is a street extension on West Kowloon Reclamation. The interchange station of West Rail line Nam Cheong station and MTR Nam Cheong station is located near its junction with Sham Mong Road and Nam Cheong Park on the other side. On the southwestern end of the street, which is on the border between Sham Shui Po and Yau Tsim Mong districts, is the Cheung Sha Wan Wholesale Fish Market.

See also

 List of streets and roads in Hong Kong

Sham Shui Po
Roads in Kowloon